Daoud was the half-brother of the 14th-century Kanem emperor Idris I of Kanem. After the death of Idris, a struggle for the throne began. Daoud was chosen as Mai against his competitors, the sons of Idris. This left the sons dejected and bitter, due to which they waged war against Daoud and his supporters; this led to a century of successive conflicts between the Idrisus and the Daouds. It is believed the conflict may have weakened the Sefuwa dynasty and made it vulnerable to external attacks.

References

14th-century monarchs in Africa
Rulers of the Kanem Empire